Petar Kajevski (born 1974) is Macedonian IT and management expert. He is most famous as creator of the Macedonian search engine "Najdi!", but also achieved prominence as expert on software outsourcing.

He finished his undergraduate studies at the Faculty of Electrical Engineering in Skopje, and earned two master's degrees: from the London School of Economics in 2004, and St Gallen University, Switzerland, in 2005.

References

External links
Najdi! website
Petar Kajevski bio on Macedonian Wikipedia

Alumni of the London School of Economics
Macedonian businesspeople
1974 births
Living people